This list includes many  museums and cultural institutions in Indonesia (including aquariums, zoos, and botanical gardens, following the definition of the International Council of Museums).

Heritage buildings such as candi, mosques, colonial churches and buildings with no site museum should not be placed in the list.

History

Colonial period

Before the 20th-century, there was little interest in the study of the native culture of Indonesia by the colonial government. Most anthropologic studies were done by a few non-governmental institutions and individuals. Among the non-governmental institution was the Batavian Society of Arts and Science, which established a museum for Indonesian culture and history. Individuals e.g. Sir Stamford Raffles and Dr. Snoeck Hourgrogne wrote valuable studies on native culture and history before the 20th-century.

The first museum in Indonesia seems to have been that built by Rumphius in Ambon, built in 1662. Nothing remains of it except books written by himself, which are now in the library of the National Museum. Its successor was the Batavia Society of Art and Science, established on April 24, 1778. It built a museum and a library, played an important role in research, and collected much material on the natural history and culture of Indonesia. It later came under the direct control of the British Lieutenant-Governor Raffles who, among other things, provided it with a new office building for the museum and library administration. The museum collection and library continued to grow, and in 1862 the government built, in the center of New Batavia, what is now the National Museum, the previous building is now Wayang Museum in Jakarta Old Town. The whole collection was transferred to the Government of the Republic of Indonesia in 1962.

The Batavia Society of Art and Science also specialized in social sciences. In 1817 it made the plans for the Hortus Botanicus Bogoriense in Bogor. In 1894 it set up the Museum Zoologicum Bogoriense. The Bibliotheca Bogoriense made Bogor into an important center of biological science.

Except for the Radya Pustaka Museum in Surakarta (1890), no other major museums were established in the 19th century. It was only in the 1930s that local museums began to appear, usually privately initiated, by civil servants and Catholic and Protestant missionaries. These museums are praiseworthy, but are not always in expert hands, and are often run by boards which do not always function continually. Some museums suffer from the lack of regular resources, and some have disappeared completely, e.g. the Karo Museum in Berastagi, North Sumatra, set up by Dr Neuman, was abolished during the Japanese occupation (1942–45); and the Banjarmasin Museum built by Dr Malinkrodt, an expert on customs and traditions in Kalimantan, was burned down.

At the beginning of the 20th century, the colonial government became interested in the maintenance and restoration of cultural remains. In 1901 it set up the Commissie in Nederlandsch Indie voor Oudheidkundige Onderzoek van Java en Madoera, headed by Dr J. L. A. Brandes. In 1913, this became the more effective Oudheid-kundige Dienst van Nederlandsch Indie (Archaeological Service), under Professor Dr. N.J. Kromm. The government also employed officials to make a study of local languages and started the Kantoor voor Inlandsche Zaken.

In 1918 Balai Poestaka was created to publish books of literary value in Malay and local languages. Malay was taught in schools next to the local language. Prospective civil servants were obliged to study the language and customs of the region they were to work in. Training was given in Leiden, in the Netherlands. Native Indonesians also came to realize the importance of their national culture in awakening nationalism, part of a general contemporary phenomenon in Asia. This nationalism was pioneered by Budi Utomo in 1908 in the STOVIA, whose building, the School for Javanese Doctors, is converted into a museum today.

Modern technology and cultural change leads to disappearance of indigenous handicrafts. There was no longer a market for plait-work, textiles, earthenware, and brass, silver and gold objects. The result was a gradual process of cultural impoverishment. A need for money forced people to sell their heirlooms on the market, and many objects that should have been kept in Indonesia found their way to foreign countries. This condition prompted the building of the Sana Budaya Museum in Yogyakarta in 1935. Dr. F. D. K. Bosch, then Head of the Archaeology Service, and now Museum Director of the Batavia Society, first referred to cultural impoverishment, and the need for historical and cultural museums, to encourage people to appreciate their own products and to improve the quality of their handicrafts.

The late Director of the Municipal Museum of Surabaya, Von Faber, emphasized the role of museums in education. The famous painter, Walter Spies, actively helped in the creation and management of the Bali Museum in Denpasar. Unfortunately, the decision to establish museums at the time was not matched by a determination to find experts capable of managing them properly. Only a few language experts like Professor Husein Jayadiningrat and Professor Dr. Purbacaraka were interested in museums-mainly because the university produced few experts in history and the social
sciences, but concentrated on training physicians, lawyers, technicians and civil servants. It was not until independence that the social sciences began to develop.

Japanese occupation
During the brief period of Japanese occupation between 1942 and 1945, there was a stimulation on Indonesian culture. One of the cultural society established by the colonial Japanese government was the Keimin Bunka Sidosho or KBS in 1943. The core policy of the KBS is to promote the cultural unity of the "Greater East Asia". Agus Jaya was appointed as head of the arts, Usmar Ismail as head of film and drama, Armijn Pane as head of literature, and Ibu Sud as head of dance and singing. The KBS actively held exhibitions and performances in big cities of the Japanese-occupied Dutch East Indies. During the three-and-a-half years of Japanese occupation, the Indonesian arts flourish with dozens of art exhibitions, performances, and awards. Among local artists member of the KBS were Emiria Sunassa, Henk Ngantung, Agus Djaja Suminta, Kartono Yudokusumo, Dullah, Basuki Resobowo, Sudiardjo, Otto Djaja, Subanto, Abdulsalam, Suyono, Surono, Siauw Tik Kwie, Ong Lian Hong, Tan Sun Tiang, Liwem Wan Gie, Harijadi S, Tan Liep Poen, Sukardi, Affandi and S. Tutur.

Another movement founded by the Japanese government was the People's Power Movement (Poesat Tenaga Rakjat, Poetera) on March 9, 1932. Even though Poetera was largely a political organization, the movement had its own cultural division, with native artist Sodjojono appointed as the head of the fine arta and cultural division.

Post-independence
The newly independent government of Indonesia established the Ministry of Education and Culture in accordance with Article 32 in the 1945 Constitution. The Department of Culture was divided into Archaeological, Art, and Language Divisions. The Art Division set up several educational institutions including the Indonesian Academy of Fine Arts in Yogyakarta (1950), the Indonesian School of Music in Yogyakarta (1952), and Karawitan Conservatoire in Surakarta (1950). In 1952, The Language Division was split into two, the first one retained the same name and the same position in the Department of Culture, the other was included in the Institute of Literature (former Instituut voor Taal en Cultuur Onderzoek, Faculteit der Lettera en Wijsbegeerte van de Universiteit van Indonesia). Also in 1952, the Department of Culture opened provincial "cultural offices" in Medan (North Sumatra), Bukit Tinggi (Central Sumatra), Palembang (South Sumatra), Jakarta, Bandung (West Java), Surabaya (East Java), Makassar (South Sulawesi), Denpasar (Bali) and Ambon (Moluccas).

In 1956, there were several changes in the Department of Culture, which include the additional responsibility of museum management (the Museum Section). Other changes were: the conversion of the Archaeological Division into the autonomous Institute of Archaeology; the Language Division in the Institute of Literature became the Language Division of the Literary Faculty of Indonesia; and the Language Division became the Sub-Division of Customs and Traditions. 

Later, the Department of Culture was included into the Directorate of Culture as part of the ministerial reorganization of the 1960s. The reorganization also converted the Museum Section into the autonomous National Museum Institute. Following the reorganization, the Ministry of Education and Culture consisted of one Directorate of Culture and four autonomous institutes: Archaeology, Language & Literature, National Museums, and History & Anthropology. The responsibility of opening provincial "cultural offices" was given to the Inspectorate of Provincial Culture.

New Order Period

At the start of the New Order, the regime of Suharto converted the Ministry of Education and Culture into five Directorates-General. The Directorate-General of Culture itself was divided into five directorates: Art, Cultural Education, Archaeology & History, Museums, and Language & Literature. Other restructuring occurred in 1969, reducing the Directorates-General into three; this time the Directorate-General of Culture consisted of three directorates: Art, Art Education, and Museums; and four Institutes: National Language, Archaeology, History & Anthropology, and Music & Choreography.

The New Order period also saw the expansion of the Armed Forces History Center and the encouragement of the development of museums of militaristic in nature. One of the reason for military involvement at first is because of the problem of internal divisions. This led to an accepted strategy of promoting shared values and identity across the forces through the use of a centralized military museum for older and younger generations of the soldiers. Some of these museums for which the Armed Forces was directly responsible are Satria Mandala Armed Forces Museum (opened in 1972), Museum of the Sacred Pancasila Monument (1982), Museum of Eternal Vigilance (1987), Soldiership Museum (1987), and the Museum of Communist Treachery (1993). The collection of these museums feature relics, photographs, and weapons. Dioramas are extensively used by the Armed Forces History Center, whom method was chosen because of a general lack of perceived value in historical objects in Indonesia as well as lack of funds.

Expansion
The number of museums in Indonesia in 1945 was 26 (including aquariums, zoos, and botanical gardens (following the definition of the International Council of Museums). Between 1945 and 1968, this increased to 46. In 2010 there were 281 museums in Indonesia, 80 of which are State Museums. At the beginning of 2015, the number of museums in Indonesia was 325. As of May 2015, Indonesia had 412 museums.

The Directorate for Museums introduced categories for the various collection types: there are general and special museums, there are privately maintained and state-run museums, both by the central and provincial governments. Those museums kept by the central government in the main operate under the administration of the Ministry of Education and Culture. Military museums are supervised by the Defence Ministry.

The most frequent type is the General Provincial Museum (Museum Umum Propinsi) which exists in almost all provincial capitals. These museums usually consist of several sections: natural history (geological, biology), ethnography, and history. Objects are sometimes flatly arranged in display cases with poor explanations. More recently established museums have already achieved higher standards with thoughtful and appealing expositions.

In Indonesia, the increase in the number of museums has not yet been matched by an increase in quality. Buildings are often unsuitable for display and for socio-educational activities; competent staffs are lacking; the public does not yet appreciate the educational role of museums; funds are lacking to maintain collections and extend building; and so on. There are not enough museums for 120 million inhabitants and a large number of State and private universities. Big cities like Jakarta, Medan, Surabaya, Bandung and Semarang need centers for science and culture, and museums as places of study and leisure.

Museums by region

Jakarta
Jakarta contains the most museums in Indonesia with over 50 museums within its 661 square kilometers area. The museums in Jakarta cluster around the Central Jakarta Merdeka Square area, Jakarta Old Town, and Taman Mini Indonesia Indah.

The Jakarta Old Town contains museums that are former institutional buildings of Colonial Batavia. Some of the notable museums are: Jakarta History Museum (former City Hall of Batavia), Wayang Museum (former Church of Batavia), the Fine Art and Ceramic Museum (former Court House of Justice of Batavia), the Maritime Museum (former Sunda Kelapa warehouse), Bank Indonesia Museum (former Javasche Bank), and Bank Mandiri Museum (former Netherlands Trading Society).

Several museums clustered in central Jakarta around the Merdeka Square area include: National Museum of Indonesia, Monas, Istiqlal Islamic Museum in Istiqlal mosque, and Jakarta Cathedral Museum on the second floor of Jakarta Cathedral. Also in the central Jakarta area is the Taman Prasasti Museum (former cemetery of Batavia), and Textile Museum in Tanah Abang area.

The recreational area of Taman Mini Indonesia Indah in East Jakarta contains almost twenty museums since the 1970s within its complex.

North Jakarta and Thousand Islands
 Maritime Museum
 Onrust Archaeology Park

West Jakarta

 Jakarta Old Town
 Bank Indonesia Museum
 Bank Mandiri Museum
 Fine Art and Ceramic Museum
 Jakarta History Museum or Museum Fatahillah
 Wayang Museum
 Jakarta Textile Museum
 Museum Lukisan Universitas Pelita Harapan
 Museum 12 Mei Universitas Trisakti
 The Museum of Modern and Contemporary Art in Nusantara

Central Jakarta

 Bentara Budaya Jakarta
 Formulation of Proclamation Text Museum (the site where the text of the nation's proclamation of independence was composed in 1945)
 Gedung Joang '45
 Gedung Kesenian Jakarta
 Gedung Mohammad Hoesni Thamrin
 Jakarta Cathedral Museum
 Jakarta Planetarium
 Museum of Indonesian History in Monas
 Museum Adam Malik (1985, closed in 2005)
 Museum Anatomi Fakultas Kedokteran Universitas Indonesia
 Museum Jenderal Besar Abdul Haris Nasution
 Museum Kebangkitan Nasional
 Museum Pers ANTARA
 Museum Puri Bhakti Renatama
 Museum Sasmita Loka Jenderal Ahmad Yani
 Museum Sumpah Pemuda
 National Gallery of Indonesia
 National Museum or Museum Gajah
 Taman Prasasti Museum

East Jakarta

 Museum Loka Jala Srana
 Museum of PKI Treason
 Monument of Sacred Pancasila
 Taman Mini Indonesia Indah
 Asmat Museum
 Indonesian Hakka Museum, formal opening at August 30, 2014
 Indonesia Museum
 Indonesia Soldiership Museum
 Indonesia Stamp Museum
 Insect Museum and Butterfly Park
 Istiqlal Museum
 Komodo Indonesian Fauna Museum and Reptile Park
 Museum of Electricity and New Energy
 Museum of Heirloom
 Museum of Lighting
 Museum of Science and Technology
 Museum of Telecommunication
 Museum of Transportation
 Oil and Natural Gas Museum
 Purna Bhakti Pertiwi Museum
 Sports Museum
 Timor Timur Museum

South Jakarta
 Basoeki Abdullah Museum
 Harry Dharsono Museum
 Kites Museum of Indonesia
 Museum Dirgantara Mandala
 Museum Kriminal (Mabak)
 Museum Manggala Wanabhakti
 Polri Museum
 Ragunan Zoo
 Reksa Artha Museum
 Satria Mandala Museum

Java

Banten
 Benteng Heritage Museum, Tangerang

West Java
 Amerta Dirgantara Museum, Subang 
 Asian–African Conference Museum, Bandung (1980)
 Bandung Geological Museum, Bandung (1928)
 Bandung Zoo, Bandung (1933)
 Barli Museum, Bandung
 Bogor Botanical Garden, Bogor (1817)
 Bogor Zoological Museum, Bogor (1894)
 Cibodas Botanical Garden, Cibodas (1852)
 Ethnobotanical Museum, Bogor
 Indonesia Post Museum, Bandung
 Kraton Kacirebonan Museum, Cirebon
 Kraton Kasepuhan Museums, Cirebon:
 Museum Diorama Bale Panyawangan, Purwakarta (2015)
 Museum Kereta Singa Barong
 Museum Benda Kuno
 Museum Linggarjati, Kuningan
 Museum Palangan B. Kokosan, Sukabumi
 Pembela Tanah Air Museum, Bogor
 Museum Bank Indonesia, Bandung
 Museum Perjuangan Jawa Barat, Bandung
 Museum Perjuangan Jawa Barat, Bogor
 Museum Prabu Geusan Ulun, Purwakarta
 Museum Tanah Nasrel, Bogor
 Percandian Batujaya Museum, Karawang 
 Sri Baduga Museum, Bandung (1980)
 Tambaksari's Site Museum, Ciamis
 Wangsit Mandala Siliwangi Museum

Central Java

 Ambarawa Railway Museum, Ambarawa
 Borobudur Complex, Magelang
Karmawibhangga Museum (1983)
Samudra Raksa Museum (2005)
 Danar Hadi Batik Museum, Surakarta (2008)
 Indonesian World Records Museum, Semarang
 Keraton Surakarta Museum, Surakarta
 Kretek Museum, Kudus
 National Press Monument and Museum, Surakarta
 Pekalongan Batik Museum, Pekalongan (1972)
 Radya Pustaka Museum, Surakarta (1890)
 Ranggawarsita Museum, Semarang
 Sangiran archeology museum, Sangiran
 Tumurun Private Museum, Surakarta

Special Region of Yogyakarta

Due to the importance of Yogyakarta during the war of independence from the Dutch, there are numerous memorials and museums. Monument Yogya Kembali and Fort Vredeburg Museum are two major museums of about 11 named in the city.
 Affandi Museum
 Code Museum
 Dewantara Kirti Griya Museum
 Dharma Wiratama Museum
 Dirgantara Mandala Museum
 Fort Vredeburg Museum
 Gembira Loka Zoo
 Jogja National Museum
 Kraton Yogyakarta Museum
 Hamengkubuwono IX Museum
 Train Museum
 Monumen Pahlawan Pancasila
 Museum Batik "Ciptowening"
 Museum Karbol TNI Angkatan Udara
 Museum Kayu Wanagama
 Museum Kebun Raya Gembira Loka
 Museum of Biology Gadjah Mada University
 Museum of Geotechnology and Mineral
 Museum Pergerakan Wanita
 Museum Perjuangan Yogyakarta
 Museum Purbakala Pleret
 Museum Pura Paku Alaman
 Museum R.S. Mata "Dr. Yap"
 Museum Tani Jawa Indonesia
 Museum Tembi (Rumah Budaya Tembi)
 Nyoman Gunarsa Museum
 Prambanan Museum
 Museum Sasmitaloka Panglima Besar (Pangsar) Jenderal Sudirman
 Sonobudoyo Museum (1939)
 Sasana Wiratama
 Taman Budaya Yogyakarta
 Museum Anak Kolong Tangga
 Ullen Sentalu Museum
 Wayang Kekayon Museum
 Yogyakarta Batik Museum
 Yogya Kembali Museum, Sleman Regency
 Museum Sandi

East Java

 10th November Museum, Surabaya
 Airlangga Museum, Kediri
 Batu Secret Zoo, Batu
 Brawijaya Museum, Malang
 Health Museum of Dr. Adhyatma, Surabaya
 House of Sampoerna, Surabaya
 Mpu Tantular State Museum, Buduran, Sidoarjo
 Museum Angkut, Batu
 Museum Bank Indonesia, Surabaya
 Museum Malang Tempo Doeloe (Good old times), Malang
 Museum Mpu Tantular, Surabaya
 Nahdlatul Ulama Museum, Surabaya
 Submarine Monument, Surabaya
 Surabaya Zoo, Surabaya
 Trowulan Museum, Trowulan (1987)

Lesser Sunda Islands

Bali
 Agung Rai Museum of Art
 Bali Botanic Garden, Bedugul (1959)
 Bali Museum (1930)
 Blanco Renaissance Museum
 Buleleng Museum, Singaraja
 Le Mayeur Museum, Sanur
 Museum Pasifika
 Museum Rudana
 Museum Semarajaya
 Neka Art Museum, Ubud (1982)
 Purbakala Archaeological Museum
 Puri Lukisan Museum

West Nusa Tenggara
 West Nusa Tenggara State Museum (1982)

East Nusa Tenggara
 East Nusa Tenggara State Museum

Sumatra
Most museums in Sumatra are ethnographic musea specializing in cultural heritage e.g. textiles and other traditional artifacts.

Aceh

 Aceh Museum, Banda Aceh (1915)
 Aceh Tsunami Museum, Banda Aceh (2009)
 Cut Nyak Dhien Mansion Museum
 Museum Malikussaleh, Lhokseumawe

North Sumatra
 Batak Museum, Balige
 Maimun Palace Museum, Medan
 Museum Huta Bolon Simanindo, Simanindo
 Museum Joang '45, Medan
 Museum Perjuangan TNI Kodam I Bukit Barisan, Medan (1971)
 Museum Rumah Bolon Pematang Purba, Pematang purba
 Museum Simalungun, Pematangsiantar (1940)
 Nias Heritage Museum, Gunungsitoli (1991). The only museum in Nias, was destroyed by the Boxing Day Tsunami. A new building for the museum has been constructed.
 North Sumatra Museum, Medan (1982)
 Sumatran Numismatic Museum, Medan (2017)
 TB Silalahi Center, Balige Subdistrict (2008)
 Tjong A Fie Mansion Museum, Medan
 Zoological Museum of Pematangsiantar, Pematangsiantar (1936)

Riau Province and Riau Islands
 Bagansiapiapi Chinese Museum, Bagansiapiapi
 Bagansiapiapi Fish Museum, Bagansiapiapi
 Bagansiapiapi History Museum, Bagansiapiapi
 Bagansiapiapi Muslim Museum, Bagansiapiapi
 Museum Kandil Riau, Tanjung Pinang (1988)
 Museum Sang Nila Utama, Pekanbaru (1994)
 Siak Sri Indrapura Palace Museum, Indrapura (Building from 1889)
 Museum Sultan Sulaiman Badrul Alamsyah, Tanjung Pinang

West Sumatra

 Adityawarman Museum, Padang (1977)
 Bung Hatta Museum, Bukittinggi
 Buya Hamka Birthplace Museum, Agam (2001)
 Tri Daya Eka Dharma Museum, Bukittinggi
 September 30, 2009 Earthquake Museum, Padang (2012)
 Gedung Joang '45, Padang
 Goedang Ransoem Museum, Sawahlunto
 Galeri Tambang Mbah Soero, Sawahlunto
 Information Center of Minangkabau Culture, Padang Panjang (1990)
 Museum Rumah Adat Baanjuang, Fort de Kock, Bukittinggi
 Railway Museum, Sawahlunto
 Museum Taman Bundo Kandung, Bukittinggi (1934)
 Museum Tri Daya Eka Dharma, Bukittinggi (1973)
 Bukittinggi Zoological Museum, Bukittinggi
 Pagaruyung Palace Museum
 Rumah Puisi Taufiq Ismail, Tanah Datar
 Rumah Kelahiran Tan Malaka, Lima Puluh Kota
 Rasuna Said Mansion Museum

Bengkulu
 Bengkulu State Museum
 Fort Marlborough, Bengkulu City

Jambi
 Jambi Museum, Jambi City (1988)
 Muaro Jambi Temple Compounds Site Museum, Muaro Jambi Regency
 Museum Perjuangan Rakyat Jambi, Jambi City (1993)

South Sumatra and Bangka–Belitung Islands

 Al-Qur'an Al-Akbar Museum
 Balaputradeva Museum, Palembang
 Museum Monpera, Palembang
 Museum UPT Belitung, Belitung
 Sriwijaya Kingdom Archaeological Park, Palembang
 Sultan Mahmud Badaruddin II Museum, Palembang
 Textile Museum, Palembang
 Word Museum, Belitung

Lampung
 Ruwa Jurai Museum, Bandar Lampung (1988)

Kalimantan
Most museums in Kalimantan specialized on cultural heritage such as textiles and other traditional artifacts. In South Kalimantan, most museums are shaped like the traditional Banjar house.

Central Kalimantan

Balanga Museum, Palangkaraya
Kayu Sampit Museum, East Kotawaringin Regency
Lewu Hante Museum, Pasar Panas, East Barito Regency

North Kalimantan
Bulungan Sultanate Museum, Bulungan Regency

East Kalimantan
Kalimantan Art Gallery, Samarinda
Mulawarman State Museum, Tenggarong Subdistrict
 Museum Batiwakkal, Gunung Tabur Subdistrict, Berau Regency
 Museum Kayu Tuah Himba, Tenggarong Subdistrict
 Museum Perjuangan Merah Putih, Sanga-Sanga Subdistrict
 Sadurengas Museum, Paser Belengkong Subdistrict
 Sendawar Museum, West Kutai Regency

South Kalimantan

Candi Agung Museum, Amuntai, North Hulu Sungai Regency
Lambung Mangkurat State Museum, Banjarbaru
 Wasaka Museum, Banjarmasin

West Kalimantan
West Kalimantan State Museum, Pontianak
Museum Dara Juanti, Sintang
Museum Istana Kadriyah, Pontianak
Museum Kapuas Raya, Sintang

Sulawesi
Most museums in Sulawesi specialize in cultural heritage such as textiles and other traditional artifacts.

North Sulawesi
 Manado Wanua Paksinata North Sulawesi Provincial Museum, Manado

Central Sulawesi
 Kaili Souraja Museum, Kaili
 Palu Central Sulawesi Provincial Museum, Palu

South Sulawesi
 Museum Batara Guru, Wara Utama Subdistrict
 Museum Indo' Ta'dung, Kete Kesu, Toraja Utara
 Museum La Galigo, Fort Rotterdam, Makassar
 Sungguminasa Balla Lompoa Museum, near Ujung Pandang

Southeast Sulawesi
 Buton Palace Museum, Baubau, Buton Island
 Southeast Sulawesi State Museum, Kendari

The Moluccas
Ambon was the site of the first recorded museum in Indonesia, a botanical museum built by Georg Eberhard Rumphius in 1662. Nothing remains of it except books written by himself, which are now in the library of the National Museum of Indonesia.

Today, museums in the Moluccas specialize in Ambonese ethnography or artifacts from the earlier Sultanates in the Moluccas.

Maluku
 Siwa Lima State Museum, Ambon (1973)

Maluku Islands

 Kedaton Sultan Ternate Museum, Kota Ternate Utara Subdistrict, Ternate (1982)
 Sonyie Malige Museum, Tidore
World War II and Trikora Museum, Morotai

Papua

Papua province
Asmat Museum of Culture and Progress, Agats (1973)
Loka Budaya Museum, Cenderawasih University, Jayapura (1973)
Papua Province State Museum, Jayapura (1983)

See also

 Tourism in Indonesia
 Culture of Indonesia
 List of museums

References

Cited works

External links

  Directory of Museums in Indonesia

 
Museums and cultural institutions in Indonesia
Museums
Indonesia
Museums
Indonesia

id:Daftar museum di Indonesia